Atsho Chhubar is a town in Paro District in western Bhutan.

References

External links 
Satellite map at Maplandia.com

Populated places in Bhutan